The Houston Cougars softball team is the college softball team of the University of Houston. The team is a member of the American Athletic Conference as a Division I team. Their home games are played at Cougar Softball Stadium on-campus. The team was established in 2001, and was the regular season champion of Conference USA three times. The Cougars are coached by Kristin Vesely.

Until their permanent home field was completed near the end of their inaugural season, the Cougars played their home games at Baseball USA, a complex in West Houston.

History

Coaching history

Awards and honors

Conference awards
AAC Pitcher of the Year
Savannah Heebner, 2018

AAC Player of the Year
Shelby Miller, 2017
Sarah Barker, 2019

AAC Rookie of the Year
Arielle James, 2017

See also
List of NCAA Division I softball programs

References

External links
 

 
2001 establishments in Texas